Love Me Forever is a studio album by American recording artist Wanda Jackson. It was released in May 1963 via Capitol Records and contained 12 tracks. It was Jackson's fifth studio album of her career and the second to included orchestrated production. Love Me Forever was a collection of country and pop music standards composed by other artists. The album received positive reviews from critics following its release.

Background and content
In the 1950s, Wanda Jackson recorded as a Rockabilly artist and released singles such as "Fujiyama Mama" and "Let's Have a Party". In 1961, Jackson made the decision to return to country music and placed two singles on the American country chart top ten. Love Me Forever was recorded during Jackson's country transition. The project's liner notes explain that Love Me Forever "demonstrates a country music background and a feelingful style can work on some of the rich and most beautiful of today's romantic ballads."

Love Me Forever contained a total of 12 tracks. Unlike other Jackson releases, the album contained recordings composed by other songwriters including Bill Anderson, Willie Nelson and Hank Williams. All of the album tracks were cover versions of songs first cut by different artists. Among these songs was Kitty Kallen's pop single "Little Things Mean a Lot", Hank Williams' "May You Never Be Alone" and Johnny Ace's "Pledging My Love". Love Me Forever was recorded in sessions held at the Bradley Studio in Nashville, Tennessee between October and November 1962. The album was produced by Ken Nelson and featured orchestrated string arrangements by Bill McElhiney.

Release and reception

Love Me Forever was released in May 1963 on Capitol Records. It was the fifth studio album issued in Jackson's career and the fifth to be released with Capitol. The project was originally issued as a vinyl LP, containing six songs on either side of the record. In later years, the album was released with an identical track listing to digital and streaming markets, including Apple Music. The project received a positive response from music critics and writers. In June 1963, Billboard magazine praised Jackson's vocals and the string arrangements set by Bill McElhiney: "Miss Jackson is in great form on this, her newest outing, and for a change, she's in almost strictly pop setting, with handsome arrangements for strings and voices by Bill McElhiney." Authors Mary Bufwack and Robert K. Oermann described Love Me Forever as "a fine album of orchestrated standards".

Track listings

Vinyl version

Digital version

Release history

References

1963 albums
Albums produced by Ken Nelson (United States record producer)
Capitol Records albums
Wanda Jackson albums